Manukyan, Manoukyan and Manukian and Western Armenian alternative transliterations Manougian,  Manuguian  and Manoogian ( is an Armenian surname. It is derived from the Armenian given name Manuk, Manug, Manoug meaning a child and the addition of yan/ian for a surname. 

Manukyan and its alternatives can refer to the following people:

Manukian
 Aram Manukian (1879–1919), also Aram of Van and Sarkis Hovanessian, an Armenian revolutionary, politician and military commander, a leader of the Van Resistance and instrumental the foundation of the First Republic of Armenia in 1918

Manukyan
 Aghasi Manukyan, an Armenian wrestler  
 Aram Manukyan, a contemporary Armenian politician 
 Arman Manukyan,  a professor of Boğaziçi University 
 Edward Manukyan, an Armenian-American composer  
 Matild Manukyan, an Armenian-Turkish businesswoman  
 Mkhitar Manukyan, an Armenian-Kazakhstani wrestler 
 Vazgen Manukyan, a former Prime Minister of Armenia 
   
By: Mariam Manukyan 2022 age-12

Manoukian
André Manoukian (born 1957), French-Armenian songwriter, arranger, and jazz musician
Athena Manoukian (born 1994), Greek-Armenian singer and songwriter
Catherine Manoukian (born 1981), Canadian Armenian violinist
David Manoukian (born 1975), French-Belgian-Armenian businessman, real estate investor and founder, chairman, and CEO of the luxury social network service The-Sphere.com
Diran Manoukian (born 1919), French field hockey player and Olympian 
Don Manoukian (1934–2014), American-Armenian football guard and professional wrestler
Gev Manoukian, Top 20 finalist in season 4 of So You Think You Can Dance in 2008
Guy Manoukian, Lebanese-Armenian musician, composer and pianist
Martik Manoukian, American Idol participant
Martiros Manoukian (born 1947), Armenian artist
Rafi Manoukian, Lebanese-born Armenian American businessman, and Glendale City council member and at times city mayor
Athina Manoukian, Greek-Armenian singer
Martik Manoukian, American Idol participant

Manoukyan
 Sargis Manoukyan, founding member of the Armenian rock band Empyray

Manougian
Manoug Manougian, Lebanese Armenian scientist, professor, and father of the Lebanese space program
Nourhan Manougian (born 1948), 97th and incumbent Armenian Patriarch of Jerusalem serving the Armenian Patriarchate of Jerusalem since January 2013

Manoogian
Alex Manoogian (1901–1996), Armenian-American businessman, industrial engineer, and philanthropist
Armenuhi Manoogian (1915-2011), known as Kay Armen, American Armenian singer, songwriter, radio, TV, film and stage actress
Haig P. Manoogian (1916–1980), professor of film at New York University
John Manoogian III, CTO and internet artist
Louise Manoogian Simone (1933-2019), founding member of the Board of Trustees of the Armenian General Benevolent Union
Mari Manoogian (born 1992), State representative for Michigan's 40th House of Representatives district
Richard Manoogian (born 1936), Armenian-American businessman
Robert Manoogian, Jr. (1918–2002), better known as Bobby Managoff, American professional wrestler who was best known for his work with National Wrestling Alliance in the 1940s
Torkom Manoogian (1919-2012), former Armenian Patriarch of Jerusalem who served as Patriarch from 1990 until his death in 2012

See also
AGBU Manoogian-Demirdjian School, Armenian-American private school located in Winnetka, Los Angeles, California, USA
Manoogian Mansion, the official residence of the mayor of Detroit, Michigan
Manuk (disambiguation) including a section of the Armenian given name Manuk

Armenian-language surnames